In mathematics, the Cheeger bound is a bound of the second largest eigenvalue of the transition matrix of a finite-state, discrete-time, reversible stationary Markov chain. It can be seen as a special case of Cheeger inequalities in expander graphs.

Assume this chain has stationary distribution .

Define

and for  define

 

Define the constant  as

 

 

has eigenvalues .  It is known that  .   The Cheeger bound is a bound on the second largest eigenvalue .

 Theorem (Cheeger bound):

See also 
 Stochastic matrix
 Cheeger constant

References 
 J. Cheeger, A lower bound for the smallest eigenvalue of the Laplacian, Problems in Analysis, Papers dedicated to Salomon Bochner, 1969, Princeton University Press, Princeton, 195-199.
 P. Diaconis, D. Stroock, Geometric bounds for eigenvalues of Markov chains, Annals of  Applied Probability, vol. 1, 36-61, 1991, containing the version of the bound presented here.

Probabilistic inequalities
Stochastic processes
Statistical inequalities